North High School was a public high school in the city of Youngstown, Ohio, United States. It was established by the Coitsville Township School District in approximately 1913 as Science Hill High School and was known as Scienceville High School until 1945. (The Science Hill name was changed to Scienceville due to a post office duplicate name that existed at another location.) Beginning in the mid 1930s some Scienceville High School students asked the Youngstown Board of Education to change the school's name.  The Scienceville area of the city was unknown to many local residents and since the area was annexed into the city in 1928, it was believed that a name change would help bring awareness to local residents that this area was now part of the city. The name was therefore changed to North High School (even though the school was on the city's east side) and was opposed by some alumni. The original building (1906) was located in the Scienceville neighborhood on the west side of Liberty Road between Cornwall and Fairfax Streets in what was then Coitsville Township.  This building replaced a one-room school house at this site.  A schoolhouse was constructed in Scienceville in 1840, thus confirming a long history of the presence of a school in the Scienceville area. This area became part of the east side of the City of Youngstown and the Youngstown City School District following an annexation in 1928. Mr. Warren L. Richey was superintendent of the Coitsville Township School District when the Youngstown City School District annexed the Coitsville school district and he became principal of the high school until retiring in 1957. The second building  (c. 1922) was located on the east side of Liberty Road across the street from the original building.  The original building was used as an elementary school after the second building opened.  The second building became Science Hill Junior High after the third building opened. A section of the building also served as an elementary school for a few years. The third building was opened in 1956 and was located on Mariner Avenue. When this building opened in 1956, the name change controversy from the past resurfaced as many alumni wanted the Scienceville name restored. The school board retained the North High name and named the old high school building Science Hill Junior High since Science Hill was the original name of the first school constructed.  Martin Luther King elementary school is currently located on the Mariner Avenue site. The sites of the first and second buildings are currently vacant. North High was the smallest of the six Youngstown City School District high schools and served the Sharon Line (Scienceville and McGuffey Heights) neighborhoods as well as most of Coitsville Township.  The Sharon Line streetcar operated near the high school at McGuffey and Liberty Roads.  The school was closed following the 1979–1980 school year due to low enrollment.

The North Bulldogs wore the colors of red and black and participated in the Youngstown City Series, although the football program did not join the Youngstown City Series until the early 1950s.

Notable alumni

 Tommy Bell, professional boxer (Scienceville HS)
 Mike Cobb, former professional football player
 A. J. Jones, former professional football player
 John Nocera, former professional football player
 Sherman Smith, former professional football player and coach

References

External links
 District Website
 1946 Silhouette, North High School Yearbook

High schools in Mahoning County, Ohio
Education in Youngstown, Ohio
Defunct schools in Ohio
1925 establishments in Ohio